Highway 827, Route 827, or State Road 827, may refer to routes in the United States:

Canada
  in Alberta

United States
  in Florida
  in Indiana
  in Maryland
  in Nevada
  in Puerto Rico